Matthew Santos is an American rock and folk singer-songwriter, musician and painter. His music was used in a series of two radio ads for American Family Insurance. He became well known for his collaboration with Chicago rapper Lupe Fiasco on the single "Superstar". He was signed to Lupe Fiasco's 1st & 15th Entertainment record label, a subsidiary of Atlantic Records.

Biography

Early years
Matthew Santos was born on December 28, 1982, in Minneapolis, Minnesota. His mother, Judy, is from Denmark and his father, Dave, is of Filipino and Spanish descent.

He graduated from Southwest High School in Minneapolis. He moved to Chicago in 2001 to study music composition at Columbia College Chicago.

Music career
Santos released his album Matters of the Bittersweet in November 2007, under indie label Candyrat Records. Following the release of the album, he developed a following surrounding his video performances on YouTube.
His five-piece band includes Aviva Jaye (vocals, keyboard), Robert Tucker (drums), Graham Burris (bass), and Matthew Nelson (keyboard).

In 2006, Santos was featured on Lupe Fiasco's Food & Liquor album on the song "American Terrorist." Santos was featured on three additional tracks on Lupe Fiasco's The Cool, released in December 2007; "Superstar", "Streets On Fire", and "Fighters". Santos joined Fiasco on his world tour in 2008, including appearances on MTV's Total Request Live and Spring Break, Jimmy Kimmel Live!, The Ellen DeGeneres Show, The Late Late Show with Craig Ferguson and a debut talk show performance on David Letterman's first live show after the 2007 Writers Guild of America Strike.

In 2007, Santos opened the mtvU Woodie Awards with Lupe Fiasco and performed at the 2008 mtv's Video Music Awards. In addition, Santos performed at Glastonbury Festival, Bonnaroo Festival, the Las Vegas Vegoose Music Festival, Lollapalooza Chicago, South by Southwest, Coachella Valley Music and Arts Festival, Summerfest, and Chicago's Around the Coyote Arts Festival.

In 2009, Santos was featured on the single "Chaconne" by Twin Cities hip hop artist Dessa, a member of Doomtree, from her album A Badly Broken Code. That summer, he was featured in Chicago magazine as one of the city's top singles.

In 2010, Santos released the album This Burning Ship of Fools. In 2012, Santos released the album Quickly Disappearing.

Discography

Albums
As a Crow Flies EP (2006)
Matters of the Bittersweet (2007, CandyRat Records)
This Burning Ship of Fools (2010, Love Sick Fool Records)
Quickly Disappearing (2012, CandyRat Records)
Into the Further (2015, CandyRat Records)

Singles

Featured singles

Guest appearances

References

External links
 Interview with Matthew Santos on Centerstage Chicago
 The Official Matthew Santos Website

1982 births
American folk singers
American rock singers
Singers from Chicago
Living people
Musicians from Minneapolis
Atlantic Records artists
American musicians of Filipino descent
American people of Spanish descent
American people of Danish descent
Singers from Minnesota
21st-century American singers
21st-century American male singers